A Smile in the Mind: Witty thinking in graphic design is a graphic design book written by Beryl McAlhone and David Stuart in 1996. It was first published in hardback in May 1996 through Phaidon Press and was later revised and updated in 2016. The book includes work from over 300 designers in the United States, Britain, Europe and Japan, and a series of interviews with designers such as Ivan Chermayeff, Milton Glaser, and Alan Fletcher.

The RSA Journal gave 'A Smile in the Mind''' a review stating that there are places where the "wit wears thin" but "these interludes are few and far between" and praised the work for its images and examples. Print'' also gave a review, writing that it was "not only entertaining, it's also a valuable instruction manual for one of the most useful but difficult-to-judge aspects of contemporary graphics."

References 

1996 books
Graphic design